Jonathan Wolfson (born December 1, 1970) is an American artist manager and television executive. Wolfson currently operates Wolfson Entertainment (previously Wolfson Public Relations).

Early life and education
Jonathan Wolfson was born in Spring Valley, New York on December 1, 1970 and attended Northeastern University. In 1994, Wolfson moved to Los Angeles, CA.

Career
Wolfson became an apprentice to publicist Lee Solters who later promoted him to the music department. After his work with Solters, Wolfson created his own publicity company "Wolfson Public Relations".

Wolfson Public Relations 
Wolfson signed Record Executive Marion “Suge” Knight and his record label Death Row Records for publicity services to Wolfson Public Relations after a personal visit to the hip-hop mogul in Mule Creek State Prison in 2000.

Past clientele include Suge Knight, The Doors, 3 Doors Down, Godsmack, Yanni, The Dirty Heads, Everlast, Tonic, Afroman, Peter Noone, Big Tymers, Beth Hart, Nick Lachey, Toto, Blue October, YES, The Syn, T-Pain, Wu-Tang Clan, DMX, the Ventures, Motown’s 50th Anniversary, SRC/Loud Records founder Steve Rifkind and Cash Money’s Bryan “Birdman” Williams and Ronald “Slim” Williams.

Wolfson Entertainment 
The company began managing artists in 2009 with Hall & Oates as its first act after doing publicity for the duo for five years at Wolfson PR.  Loverboy was the next group to sign up for its management department. Present clientele include Daryl Hall & John Oates, Loverboy, Huey Lewis & The News, The Tubes.

Executive Producer 
Daryl Hall’s music series Live From Daryl’s House is executive produced by both Hall and Wolfson. The show is centered on jam sessions that feature Daryl Hall performing with various artists he invites to the show, which originated at his home in Millerton, New York in 2007.  Since 2007, it has since broadcast over 80 episodes online and on TV.   The series aired on MTV LIVE (formerly Palladia) for over six years.  In April of 2020, the series started airing on AXS-TV.   Wolfson also co-executive produced the DIY Network show, “Daryl’s Restoration Over-Hall,” which aired in 2014.

On April 5, 2018, industry trade, Variety, announced that Live Nation had acquired Wolfson Entertainment. The company, now under Artist Nation, is still run by Jonathan Wolfson

Personal life
Wolfson lives in Los Angeles and is married with two children.

References

1970 births
Living people
People from Spring Valley, New York
American television executives
Television producers from New York (state)